Alec Gehard Olson (born September 11, 1930) is a former member of the U.S. House of Representatives, a former state senator, who served as the 40th Lieutenant Governor of Minnesota. He was born in Mamre Township in Kandiyohi County, Minnesota.

Biography
Olson attended public schools and graduated from Willmar High School in 1948. He farmed between 1948 and 1955, and was an insurance representative from 1955 to 1962. He was active in the Minnesota Democratic-Farmer-Labor Party from 1952 to 1962, serving as a district chairman for four years. He was a delegate to the Democratic National Convention in 1960, 1964 and 1968.

Olson served in the U.S. House of Representatives from January 3, 1963, to January 3, 1967, during the 88th and 89th Congresses. He lost his bid for re-election in 1966. Olson served in the Minnesota Senate from 1969 to 1976 and was Senate president from 1973 to 1976. When Wendell Anderson resigned the governorship to become a U.S. senator in 1976 and was succeeded by Lieutenant Governor Rudy Perpich, Olson became the new lieutenant governor; he served from December 29, 1976 – January 3, 1979, and was Perpich's running mate in Minnesota's 1978 gubernatorial race.

References

External links
Minnesota Historical Society: Alec Olson Profile

1930 births
Living people
Lieutenant Governors of Minnesota
People from Willmar, Minnesota
People from Kandiyohi County, Minnesota
Presidents of the Minnesota Senate
Democratic Party members of the United States House of Representatives from Minnesota